Alexander L. George (May 31, 1920 Chicago – August 16, 2006 Seattle) was an American behavioral scientist. He was the Graham H. Stuart Professor of Political Science Emeritus at Stanford University. He made influential contributions to political psychology, international relations, and social science methodology.

Life
His parents were Assyrians from Urmia in north-west Persia.
He earned undergraduate and graduate degrees at the University of Chicago, where he received his doctorate in political science in 1958.

According to David A. Hamburg he was the among the first to lead behavioral scientists into studying the "very painful and dangerous" issues of nuclear crisis management during the Cold War era and to carry knowledge directly to policy leaders. George "focused a great deal of attention on reducing nuclear danger," he added. "I regard him as a truly great scholar and human being."

Awards
 1975 Bancroft Prize
 1983 MacArthur Foundation Fellowship
 1997 NAS Award for Behavior Research Relevant to the Prevention of Nuclear War from the National Academy of Sciences.
 1998 Johan Skytte Prize in Political Science
2000 membership to the American Philosophical Society

Works

 
 
 

 
 
 
 George, Alexander/Simons William E., 1994: The Limits of Coercive Diplomacy, Colorado/Oxford: Westview Press

References

External links

1920 births
2006 deaths
MacArthur Fellows
American political scientists
Scientists from Chicago
American people of Iranian-Assyrian descent
Scholars of diplomacy
Bancroft Prize winners
University of Chicago alumni
Members of the American Philosophical Society
20th-century political scientists